Maria Feodorovna Nagaya (died 1608) was a Russian tsaritsa and sixth (possibly eighth) uncanonical wife of Ivan the Terrible.

Life
Maria married Ivan in 1581 and a year later, she gave birth to their son Dmitry. In 1582, the tsar suggested to queen Elizabeth I of England that he would marry her relative Mary Hastings and divorce his wife Maria Nagaya, but these plans never came to fruition. Maria was not favored by her husband, and only the birth of her son spared her banishment from court.

After the Tsar's death in 1584, Nagaya was not granted any property in the will of the late tsar, but left to live on the income from the land of her son, who was granted Uglich, and both she and her son was placed under the guardianship of the boyars.  While the guardian regency of the new tsar, led by Boris Godunov, granted Maria an allowance, she was nevertheless forced to leave the court and the capital and depart with her son and her brothers to her son's city of Uglich.

In 1591, her son Dmitry died in Uglich of an epileptic seizure.  A commission was instigated by Godunov to investigate the death of her son, and Maria and her brothers supported the rumour that her son had died due to a political murder committed by Godunov, and supported a riot that attacked Pro-Godunov boyars' houses in Uglich.  They were however called to Moscow where Maria and her relatives were accused of "criminal negligence" and, as a result, her brothers were incarcerated, and she was made a nun in the Beloozero monastery.

In 1604, upon rumors that Maria had met the pretender the False Dmitry I, who posed as her son, she was called by Godunov, who questioned her, but she denied having met Dmitry and was sent back to the convent. In 1605, after the accession of False Dmitriy in Moscow, Nagaya famously legitimized him as pretender by identifying him as her son and returned to Moscow.  All of her family members were freed, reinstated in their ranks, and given their confiscated property.

In 1606, the Vasily Shuiski had the body of her son Dmitry exhumed in the hope to prove that it was the body of another.

References

 Зимин А. А. В канун грозных потрясений: Предпосылки первой Крестьянской войны в России. М., 1986

|-

|-

16th-century births
1608 deaths
17th-century Russian women
Wives of Ivan the Terrible
Year of birth unknown
Russian nuns